Carlos Michael "Mikey" Gomez (born May 8, 1982) is a Paraguayian former mixed martial artist. A professional from 2005 until 2015, he competed for Bellator, EliteXC, Cage Warriors, XFC, and RFA.

Mixed martial arts career

Early career
After compiling a 2-0 amateur record in 2004, Gomez made his professional debut against 14-2-1 future UFC veteran Carlo Prater in February 2005. Gomez was defeated via unanimous decision after two rounds. After amassing a 6-3 record, Gomez was signed by EliteXC.

EliteXC
Gomez made his promotional debut at EliteXC: Street Certified, losing via unanimous decision in an upset to 1-1 Eric Bradley. After two wins in other promotions, he returned at EliteXC: Heat in October 2008, defeating then-undefeated Italian fighter Lorenzo Borgomeo via second-round armbar submission.

After the financial collapse of EliteXC in 2008, Gomez was signed by Bellator in 2009.

Bellator
Gomez made his promotional debut at Bellator 2 in May 2009 against Jesse Juarez. Gomez lost via first-round TKO.

He returned to face Juarez in a rematch at Bellator 10, losing again via unanimous decision.

After consecutive losses and falling to 9-7, Gomez faced War Machine (then known as Jon Coppenhaver) for the Xtreme Fighting Championships promotion. Gomez was defeated via third-round TKO. He returned to Bellator at Bellator 13 in May 2010, set to make his Middleweight debut. However, Gomez missed weight (187 lbs). Gomez won via unanimous decision.

Post-Bellator
Gomez went 7-5 in his next 12 fights, last appearing in 2015; a 26-second TKO loss.

Championships and accomplishments
Cage Warriors Fighting Championship
CWFC Welterweight Championship (One time)

Mixed martial arts record

|-
| Loss
| align=center| 17–13
| Justin Polendey
| TKO (punches)
| The Main Event
| 
| align=center| 1
| align=center| 0:26
| San Diego, California, United States
|
|-
| Loss
| align=center| 17–12
| Dominic Waters
| Decision (unanimous)
| RFA 23: Murphy vs. Ware
| 
| align=center| 3
| align=center| 5:00
| Costa Mesa, California, United States
|Welterweight bout.
|-
| Loss
| align=center| 17–11
| Francisco France
| Submission (arm-triangle choke)
| RFA 21: Juusola vs. Baghdad
| 
| align=center| 1
| align=center| 1:43
| Costa Mesa, California, United States
|Return to Middleweight.
|-
| Win
| align=center| 17–10
| Khadzhimurat Bestaev
| Submission (rear-naked choke)
| Gladiator Challenge: Glove Up
| 
| align=center| 2
| align=center| 1:30
| San Jacinto, California, United States
|Light Heavyweight debut; won the vacant Gladiator Challenge Middleweight Championship.
|-
| Loss
| align=center| 16–10
| Jaime Jara
| Submission (front choke)
| Gladiator Challenge: Revenge
| 
| align=center| N/A
| align=center| N/A
| Lincoln, California, United States
|For the Gladiator Challenge Middleweight Championship.
|-
| Win
| align=center| 16–9
| Donald Palmer
| TKO (punches)
| Gladiator Challenge: Slug Fest
| 
| align=center| 1
| align=center| 0:40
| San Jacinto, California, United States
| 
|-
| Win
| align=center| 15–9
| Ronald LeBreton Jr.
| Submission (armbar)
| BAMMA USA: Badbeat 9
| 
| align=center| 1
| align=center| 1:37
| Commerce, California, United States
| 
|-
| Win
| align=center| 14–9
| David Johnson
| Submission (arm-triangle choke)
| Xplode Fight Series: Devastation
| 
| align=center| 1
| align=center| 2:10
| San Pasqual Valley, California, United States
| 
|-
| Win
| align=center| 13–9
| Edward Darby
| Submission (armbar)
| Xplode Fight Series: Revancha
| 
| align=center| 1
| align=center| 0:53
| San Pasqual Valley, California, United States
| 
|-
| Loss
| align=center| 12–9
| Josh Samman
| TKO (submission to punches)
| XFC 16: High Stakes
| 
| align=center| 1
| align=center| 3:37
| Knoxville, Tennessee, United States
| 
|-
| Win
| align=center| 12–8
| Mike Bernhard
| Submission (rear naked choke)
| XFC 14: Resurrection
| 
| align=center| 2
| align=center| 3:50
| Orlando, Florida, United States
|Gomez missed weight (187 lbs).
|-
| Win
| align=center| 11–8
| James Brasco
| TKO (submission to punches)
| World Extreme Fighting 46 
| 
| align=center| 1
| align=center| 4:33
| Orlando, Florida, United States
|Middleweight debut.
|-
| Win
| align=center| 10–8
| Moyses Gabin
| Decision (unanimous)
| Bellator 13
| 
| align=center| 3
| align=center| 5:00
| Hollywood, Florida, United States
|Catchweight (187 lbs) bout; Gomez missed weight.
|-
| Loss
| align=center| 9–8
| War Machine
| TKO (punches)
| XFC 9: Evolution
| 
| align=center| 3
| align=center| 0:19
| Tampa, Florida, United States
| 
|-
| Loss
| align=center| 9–7
| Jesse Juarez
| Decision (unanimous)
| Bellator 10
| 
| align=center| 3
| align=center| 5:00
| Ontario, California, United States
|Catchweight (175 lbs) bout.
|-
|  Loss
| align=center| 9–6
| Jesse Juarez
| TKO (punches)
| Bellator 2
| 
| align=center| 1
| align=center| 4:23
| Uncasville, Connecticut, United States
| 
|-
|  Loss
| align=center| 9–5
| André Galvão
| Submission (armbar)
| FSC: Evolution
| 
| align=center| 1
| align=center| 3:59
| Hagersville, Ontario, Canada
| 
|-
|  Win
| align=center| 9–4
| Lorenzo Borgomeo
| Submission (armbar)
| EliteXC: Heat
| 
| align=center| 2
| align=center| 4:06
| Sunrise, Florida, United States
| 
|-
|  Win
| align=center| 8–4
| Charles Blanchard
| Submission (triangle choke)
| Cage Warriors: USA Unleashed
| 
| align=center| 1
| align=center| 2:01
| Orlando, Florida, United States
| 
|-
|  Win
| align=center| 7–4
| Antonio Grant
| TKO (strikes)
| XFC 4: Judgment in the Cage
| 
| align=center| 1
| align=center| 0:27
| Tampa, Florida, United States
| 
|-
|  Loss
| align=center| 6–4
| Eric Bradley
| Decision (unanimous)
| EliteXC: Street Certified
| 
| align=center| 3
| align=center| 5:00
| Miami, Florida, United States
| 
|-
|  Win
| align=center| 6–3
| Justin Haskins
| Submission (triangle choke)
| WEF: King of the Streets
| 
| align=center| 2
| align=center| N/A
| Kissimmee, Florida, United States
| 
|-
|  Win
| align=center| 5–3
| Esteban Ramos
| Decision (split)
| Knight Fight
| 
| align=center| 3
| align=center| N/A
| Orlando, Florida, United States
| 
|-
|  Loss
| align=center| 4–3
| Glenn Mincer
| Decision (unanimous)
| World Extreme Fighting 8
| 
| align=center| 3
| align=center| 5:00
| Kissimmee, Florida, United States
| 
|-
|  Win
| align=center| 4–2
| Shawn Gay
| Submission (rear-naked choke)
| Combat Fighting Championship 2
| 
| align=center| 2
| align=center| 1:47
| Orlando, Florida, United States
| 
|-
|  Win
| align=center| 3–2
| Jeremy May
| Submission (armbar)
| Combat Fighting Championship 1
| 
| align=center| 2
| align=center| 1:49
| Orlando, Florida, United States
| 
|-
|  Win
| align=center| 2–2
| Matt Brown
| Submission (rear-naked choke)
| Absolute Fighting Championships 17
| 
| align=center| 1
| align=center| 3:35
| Florida, United States
| 
|-
|  Win
| align=center| 1–2
| Tim Stout
| Submission (triangle choke)
| Absolute Fighting Championships 16
| 
| align=center| 1
| align=center| 3:30
| Boca Raton, Florida, United States
| 
|-
|  Loss
| align=center| 0–2
| Rick Delvecchio
| Decision (unanimous)
| Absolute Fighting Championships 13
| 
| align=center| 2
| align=center| 5:00
| Fort Lauderdale, Florida, United States
| 
|-
|  Loss
| align=center| 0–1
| Carlo Prater
| Decision
| Absolute Fighting Championships 11
| 
| align=center| 2
| align=center| 5:00
| Fort Lauderdale, Florida, United States
|

See also
List of male mixed martial artists

References

External links

1982 births
Living people
Paraguayan male mixed martial artists
Mixed martial artists utilizing Brazilian jiu-jitsu
Paraguayan practitioners of Brazilian jiu-jitsu
People awarded a black belt in Brazilian jiu-jitsu
Sportspeople from Ciudad del Este
Sportspeople from Temecula, California
Sportspeople from Newport Beach, California